McRoberts is a surname. Notable people with the surname include:

People
 Ally McRoberts (fl. 1972–1983), Scottish footballer
 Bob McRoberts (1874–1959), Scottish football player and manager
 Bob McRoberts (American football) (1924–2012)
 Brian McRoberts (1931–1983), solicitor and unionist politician in Northern Ireland
 Briony McRoberts (1957–2013), English actress
 Brit McRoberts (born 1957), Canadian athlete
 George McRoberts (1839–1896), Scottish chemist and early explosives expert
 Hugh McRoberts, an early settler after whom McRoberts Secondary School in Richmond, British Columbia, is named
 John Scott McRoberts (born 1962), Canadian Paralympic sailor 
 Josh McRoberts (born 1987), American basketball player
 Joyce McRoberts (fl. 1992–1995), American politician
 Justin McRoberts (born 1971), American author and songwriter
 Mike McRoberts (born 1966), New Zealand television journalist
 Nicholas McRoberts (born 1977), Australian composer and conductor
 Paul McRoberts (born 1992), American football player
 Samuel McRoberts (1799–1843), United States senator
 Samuel McRoberts (U.S. general) (1868–1947)
 William A. McRoberts, Jr., who gave his name to the McRoberts maneuver in obstetrics
 William J. McRoberts (died 1933), American businessman and politician

See also

MacRobert (disambiguation)